Thorbiskope, also known as the John Elliot House, is a historic plantation house located near Bunnlevel, Harnett County, North Carolina. It was built in two sections.  The earliest section was built about 1820, and is a -story, Georgian / Federal style frame Coastal Cottage frame dwelling that forms the rear ell. About 1848, the two-story, five bay by two bay, Greek Revival style front section was added.  It features a one-bay front portico.

It was listed on the National Register of Historic Places in 1986.

References

Plantation houses in North Carolina
Houses on the National Register of Historic Places in North Carolina
Georgian architecture in North Carolina
Federal architecture in North Carolina
Greek Revival houses in North Carolina
Houses completed in 1820
Houses in Harnett County, North Carolina
National Register of Historic Places in Harnett County, North Carolina